Mary Marshall (née Paley; 24 October 1850 – 19 March 1944) was an economist who in 1874 had been one of the first women to take the Tripos examination at Cambridge University – although, as a woman, she had been excluded from receiving a degree. She was one of a group of five women who were the first to be admitted to study at Newnham College, the second women's college to be founded at the University.

Childhood 
Paley was born in the village of Ufford, near Stamford, Lincolnshire, second daughter of the Reverend Thomas Paley and his wife Judith . Her father was Rector of Ufford and a former Fellow of St John's College, Cambridge. She was a great-granddaughter of the theologian and philosopher William Paley.

Education 
She was educated at home, excelling in languages: in 1871, after performing well in entrance exams, she earned a scholarship to become one of the first five students at the recently founded Newnham College in Cambridge. She took the Moral Sciences Tripos in 1874, and was classed between a first and second-class, though as a woman she was debarred from graduation. Paley sat the exam with Amy Bulley. They were some of the first women to take tripos examinations and they sat the exams in Marion and Benjamin Hall Kennedy's drawing room. Paley described Professor Kennedy as excitable, but he would sometimes doze whilst invigilating. The only evidence she was given of her work was a confidential letter from her examiners. Women sitting the tripos examination was a milestone for Cambridge University and the importance can be gauged by the people involved. The people who delivered Paley and Bulley's papers were Alfred Marshall, Henry Sidgwick, John Venn and Sedley Taylor. She was to pass with honours but this did not entitle her to an official degree. Cambridge was to resist recognising its own women graduates; a restriction that was, later, to be supported by her future husband.

Life
In 1875 she was a 25-year-old economics lecturer at Newnham College. Paley had established herself financially as she was the first women lecturer at Cambridge University. She was stylish and known for wearing clothes made from the fashionable prints designed by the Pre-Raphaelites.

In 1876, Paley became engaged to Alfred Marshall who had been her economics tutor, and was at that time a strong supporter of higher education for women. In 1878 they moved to found the teaching of economics at University College, Bristol. Mary was one of the first women lecturers, although her salary was taken from her husband's pay as a Professor. In 1883 she followed him to Oxford, before the couple returned to Cambridge in 1885 where they built and moved into Balliol Croft (renamed Marshall House in 1991) on Madingley Road. Mary lectured on economics, and was asked to develop a book from her Cambridge lectures. Mary and Alfred wrote The Economics of Industry together, published in 1879. Alfred disliked the book, however, and it eventually went out of print, even though there was moderate demand for it. Alfred had also changed his mind about women students at Cambridge. He wrote pamphlets and letters objecting to a mixed university, and in 1897 a university law was passed preventing women from being given a Cambridge degree.

There is no record of her publicly disagreeing with her husband's support for the university's discrimination against women. She taught at Newnham and Girton until 1916 and the university did not recognise its own would-be women graduates, with a formal degree, until over 30 years after she retired.

Mary was a friend of Newnham's principal Eleanor Sidgwick. In 1890 Marshall became a member of the Ladies Dining Society several of whom were associated with Newnham College. The society was started by Louise Creighton and Kathleen Lyttelton; other members of the society included Eleanor Sidgwick, the classicist Margaret Verrall, Newnham lecturers Mary Ward and Ellen Wordsworth Darwin, the mental health campaigner Ida Darwin, Baroness Eliza von Hügel, and the US socialites Caroline Jebb and Maud Darwin. She had close links with women working in charity, encouraging Eglantyne Jebb (Caroline Jebb's niece by marriage) to enter this field as an assistant to her friend Florence Keynes; Eglantyne later went on to found Save the Children.

Mary's husband Alfred became increasingly obstructive to the cause of women's education, believing that women had nothing useful to say. When Cambridge began to consider giving women degrees, he decided to object to the idea despite the views of friends and colleagues. Mary was nevertheless devoted to her husband, and an important unofficial collaborator in his own economic writings.

According to James and Julianne Cicarelli, who wrote a book entitled Distinguished Women Economists, she was listed by John Maynard Keynes in his Essays on Biography. The Cicarellis say that “Keynes held her in the highest regard and considered her an intellectual and thinker every bit as significant to the historical development of economics as her husband or any of the other economists about whom he wrote.”

After her husband died in 1924, Mary became Honorary Librarian of the Marshall Library of Economics at Cambridge, to which she donated her husband's collection of articles and books on economics. She worked there as a librarian for twenty years until her doctors ordered her to stop, which she did reluctantly. She continued to live in Balliol Croft until her death on 19 March 1944 at the age of 93. Her ashes were scattered in the garden. Her husband is buried in the Ascension Parish Burial Ground.

Mary Marshall's reminiscences were published posthumously as What I Remember (1947).

References

Further reading
 
 
  Reprinted in Keynes (1972, 2010)
 

1850 births
1944 deaths
Academics of the University of Bristol
Alumni of Newnham College, Cambridge
British economists
British women economists
People from Peterborough